was a Japanese actor. He appeared in more than 120 films from 1924 to 1967.

Career
First appearing on stage as a shingeki actor, he was initially recognized for his role as Yasha in The Cherry Orchard. He made his film debut in the 1920s and appeared in a number of films by Akira Kurosawa.

Filmography

References

External links 

1903 births
1968 deaths
Japanese male film actors
Japanese male stage actors
Actors from Tochigi Prefecture